Baranowski Glacier is a glacier flowing east into Admiralty Bay, King George Island, northwest of Demay Point. It was named by the Polish Antarctic Expedition after Stanisław Baranowski (1935–78), Polish glaciologist who died on King George Island as a result of an accident at the Henryk Arctowski Polish Antarctic Station while a member of the 1977–78 expedition.

See also
 List of glaciers in the Antarctic
 Glaciology

References
 

Glaciers of King George Island (South Shetland Islands)
Poland and the Antarctic